Rete tubular ectasia , also known as cystic transformation of rete testis is a benign condition, usually found in older men, involving numerous small, tubular cystic structures within the rete testis.

Presentation
It is usually found in men older than 55 years and is frequently found on bilateral testes but often asymmetrical.

Mechanism
The formation of cysts in the rete testis is associated with the obstruction of the efferent ducts, which connect the rete testis with the head of the epididymis. They are often bilateral.

Diagnosis
The condition can be detected with ultrasonography. Cystic lesions us usually found at the mediastinum testis with elongated shaped lesion displacing the mediastinum. It is commonly associated with epididymal abnormalities, such as spermatocele, epididymal cyst, and epididymitis. The condition  shares a common location with cystic dysplasia of the testis and intratesticular cysts. Unlike cystic neoplasms, they don't present specific tumor markers. Another distinguishing feature is that tubular ectasia of the testes are confined only to the mediastinum, unlike testicular cancer such as cystic teratoma of testis which spreads throughout the testis.

Treatment
Typically none is required, but they can be treated surgically if symptomatic.

Additional images

References

Testicle disorders
Men's health